St. Ann's Anglican Church is a church in Belmopan, Cayo District, Belize. It is located on Unity Boulevard.

During the COVID-19 pandemic, St. Ann's suspended in-person services.

References

External links 

 Official website

Churches in Belmopan